K.G. (subtitled Explorations into Microtonal Tuning, Volume 2) is the sixteenth studio album by Australian psychedelic rock band King Gizzard & the Lizard Wizard, released on 20 November 2020 on their own label. The album was preceded by four singles, the first three ("Honey", "Some of Us" and "Straws in the Wind") were released alongside music videos uploaded to YouTube. K.G. is a sonic "sequel" to Flying Microtonal Banana, which was subtitled "Explorations into Microtonal Tuning, Volume 1" and also a direct predecessor to L.W..

"Automation"
"Automation", the fourth single preceding the album, was released for free on the band's website. In addition to the raw audio files for "Automation" as a whole, the band also includes the files for separate audio channels within the song such as vocals, violin, clarinet and flute, as well as video files for the music video, which the band encourages the fans to use to make their own remixes and music videos. All of these files require a torrent client to be installed on the user's device. Since the release of "Automation", there have been many remixes and music videos edited by fans and posted on sites like Reddit and YouTube. A number of these have been highlighted by the band in the King Gizzard newsletter "Gizzymail", namely in Gizzymail 6.

Track listing
Announced by the band on 21 October 2020. Track durations taken from shop listing. Vinyl releases have tracks 1–5 on Side A, and tracks 6–10 on Side B.

Personnel 
Credits for K.G. adapted from liner notes.

King Gizzard & the Lizard Wizard
 Stu Mackenzie – vocals ,  guitar , bass guitar ,  percussion ,  keyboards , flute , sitar , synthesiser ,  clavinet , xylophone , violin , vibraphone , horns , Mellotron , piano , clarinet , organ 
 Michael Cavanagh – drums , percussion 
 Cook Craig – guitar , bass guitar , piano , keyboards , synthesiser , sitar , percussion , clarinet , flute 
 Ambrose Kenny-Smith – vocals , harmonica , keyboards , percussion , synthesiser 
 Joey Walker – vocals , guitar , bass guitar , juno , bağlama , synthesiser , Elektron Digitakt , percussion 
 Lucas Harwood – bass guitar , percussion 

Additional personnel
 Bella Walker – backing vocals 

Production
 Stu Mackenzie – production, mixing , recording 
 Joey Walker –  mixing , recording 
 Michael Cavanagh – recording 
 Cook Craig –  recording 
 Joseph Carra – mastering
 Jason Galea – artwork

Charts

References

2020 albums
King Gizzard & the Lizard Wizard albums
Psychedelic rock albums by Australian artists
Progressive rock albums by Australian artists
Microtonality